List of television broadcasters of the Military Bowl, which was known as the EagleBank Bowl prior to 2010.

TV Broadcasters

Radio Broadcasters

References

Broadcasters
Military Bowl
Military Bowl
Military Bowl